James Bartholomew may refer to:
James R. Bartholomew (born 1941), American historian specialising in the history of science in Japan
James Bartholomew (journalist) (born 1950), British journalist, known for popularising the term virtue signalling
James Bartholomew, President and CEO of DeVry University

See also
James Bartholomew Radclyffe, 4th Earl of Newburgh (1725–1787), British peer and Jacobite
James Bartholomew Blackwell (1763–1820), Irish mercenary who served Napoleon
Jimmy Olsen (James Bartholomew Olsen), fictional character appearing in DC Comics